Sabath Anthony "Sam" Mele (January 21, 1922 – May 1, 2017) was an American right fielder, manager, coach and scout in Major League Baseball.

Early life
Mele was born in 1922 in Queens, New York, where his parents had immigrated to from Italy.  Mele was the nephew of major league baseball players Tony and Al Cuccinello, but did not play baseball until he attended William Cullen Bryant High School.  The high school gave up baseball after his freshman year, but Mele played with other local baseball teams.  Mentored by his uncle Tony, Mele gained major league attention and worked out with several teams while still in high school.

After high school, Mele attended New York University.  In 1940, he broke his leg sliding into third base but, in 1941, he posted a batting average of .405, and in 1942, he hit .369.  He also excelled as a basketball player.  NYU basketball head coach Howard Cann called Mele one of the finest players he ever coached.  In the summer of 1941, Mele also played baseball for the Burlington, Vermont team of the Northern League where he made contact with the Boston Red Sox and signed a five-figure contract.

World War II service
But before he could join the Sox, he first signed up for the United States Marine Corps in 1942 and was called in July 1943.  As part of the V-12 Navy College Training Program, Mele played baseball for Red Rolfe at Yale University.  He was sent to the Pacific Ocean where he was able to play baseball with Joe DiMaggio and others.  Mele led the Navy league with a .358 average in 1944.

Playing career
In 1946, after the Marines, Mele joined the Red Sox in Sarasota, Florida, before being sent to the Louisville Colonels and, later, the Eastern League Scranton Red Sox. Mele won the Eastern League Most Valuable Player award, leading the league in batting average (.342), total bases and triples. Along the way, he acquired the nickname "Sam" from his initials.

The following year, the 1947 Red Sox, the defending American League champions, went into spring training with uncertainty at the right field position, but Mele won the job with a 5-for-5 performance, started in 90 games, and hit .302 for the season.  He also substituted well in center field when Dom DiMaggio was injured.

During his big-league career (1947–56), Mele saw duty with six major league clubs: the Red Sox, Washington Senators, Chicago White Sox, Baltimore Orioles, Cincinnati Reds and Cleveland Indians, batting .267 with 80 home runs in 1,046 games. His 916 hits also included 168 doubles, 39 triples, 406 runs and 311 bases on balls. Although he never duplicated his .302 rookie batting average, Mele had two strong back-to-back seasons for Washington in 1950–51. In , he knocked in 82 runs for the White Sox, second on the club. Defensively, Mele posted a .988 fielding percentage at all three outfield positions and at first base.

Managing career

Minnesota Twins

Early managerial and coaching career
Immediately after his playing career ended in the minor leagues in 1958, Mele became a scout for the Washington Senators. With the maiden edition of the Twins struggling at 19–30 (.388) on June 6, 1961, Mele filled in as manager, winning two of seven games while Lavagetto took a leave of absence. Mele then formally succeeded to the job on June 23, 1961. The Twins moved up two places in the standings under Mele, going 45–49 (.479) and finishing seventh.

But fortified by young players such as Hall of Famer Harmon Killebrew, Jim Kaat, Zoilo Versalles and Bob Allison, the Twins challenged the powerful New York Yankees in  before placing second.

1965 American League championship
Instead, Mele's 1965 Twins broke the Yankees' stranglehold on the American League pennant, as from 1947 to 1964, the Yankees had won all but three pennants. Led by Versalles, who was named the American League's Most Valuable Player, batting champion Tony Oliva, and pitcher Mudcat Grant, who won 21 games, Minnesota won 102 games—still a franchise record—and coasted to the league title. (The Yankees finished sixth.) Minnesota won the first two games in the 1965 World Series, but the superior pitching of the Los Angeles Dodgers' Sandy Koufax, Don Drysdale and Claude Osteen asserted itself as Los Angeles won in seven games.

1966 and beyond

The  Twins won 13 fewer games, and finished runners-up to the Baltimore Orioles. Mele also became embroiled in a clash between two of his coaches, Martin and pitching tutor Johnny Sain, which was later described by Martin as Sain's efforts to try to get Mele fired. His action (or inaction) alienated him from some of the players. Expectations were high in Minnesota, but when the Twins were only .500 after 50 games, Mele was fired. His successor was not Martin, as had been anticipated, but longtime minor league manager Cal Ermer.

Mele's record as a manager was 524–436 (.546). He never managed again at any level in baseball, but returned to the Red Sox, where he served as a special assignments scout from the midseason of 1967 until his 1994 retirement.

Managerial record

Death
Mele died on the night of May 1, 2017 at his residence in Quincy, Massachusetts of natural causes at the age of 95.

See also
 List of Major League Baseball annual doubles leaders

References

External links

 Cool of the Evening: The 1965 Minnesota Twins – Web bio by author of Twins' book
 

1922 births
2017 deaths
American men's basketball players
American people of Italian descent
Baltimore Orioles players
Baseball coaches from New York (state)
Baseball managers
Boston Red Sox players
Boston Red Sox scouts
Buffalo Bisons (minor league) players
Chicago White Sox players
Cincinnati Redlegs players
Cleveland Indians players
Indianapolis Indians players
Louisville Colonels (minor league) players
Major League Baseball outfielders
Major League Baseball third base coaches
Minnesota Twins coaches
Minnesota Twins managers
NYU Violets baseball players
NYU Violets men's basketball players
People from Astoria, Queens
Scranton Red Sox players
Sportspeople from Queens, New York
Baseball players from New York City
Sportspeople from Quincy, Massachusetts
United States Marine Corps personnel of World War II
Washington Senators (1901–1960) coaches
Washington Senators (1901–1960) players
Washington Senators (1901–60) scouts